Aineto  is a village under the local government of the municipality of Sabiñánigo, Alto Gállego, Huesca, Aragon, Spain.

Populated places in the Province of Huesca
Sabiñánigo
Towns in Spain